Anne de Ruiter (born 30 November 1999) is a Dutch professional racing cyclist. She signed to ride for the UCI Women's Team  for the 2019 women's road cycling season, but ultimately did not ride in any races for the team, and left the team.

References

External links

1999 births
Living people
Dutch female cyclists
Place of birth missing (living people)
21st-century Dutch women